Taylor Cole (born April 29, 1984) is an American actress and former fashion model.

Early life and modeling
Cole was born in Arlington, Tarrant County, Texas. Cole attended Mirabeau B. Lamar High School, where she traveled with the Junior Olympics volleyball squad and also got her start as a model. Cole later moved to New York to further her modeling career. She has appeared in commercials and advertisements for Crest toothpaste, Old Spice, and Dooney & Bourke handbags.

Career
After visiting her mother, Deborah Quinn, and stepfather, actor Shawn Christian (parents of her half-brother Kameron Christian), Cole landed an audition for the WB series Summerland. She won the role of Erika Spalding in 2004, relocating to Los Angeles to film the series.

Cole appeared in Ryan Cabrera's "True" music video, Bullet for My Valentine's video for "Tears Don't Fall" and Papa Roach's video for "Scars".

She guest-starred in The WB show Supernatural episode titled "Provenance", where she played Sarah Blake, an art dealer and later reprised the role in Season 8's "Clip Show" episode. She had a guest role in an episode of the CBS show NUMB3RS and appeared in an episode of CSI: Crime Scene Investigation as Bianca. She starred as Desiree in the horror remake, April Fool's Day.  Cole had a part in the film 12 Rounds, produced by WWE Films and starring John Cena.

In December 2008, Cole appeared as Private Rachel Mills in the Heroes webisode series, The Recruit, and subsequently joined the main series in a recurring capacity playing the same character as at the start of 2009. She starred alongside Tiffany Shepis in The Violent Kind. She played the role of "Hot Neighbor" in the short-lived TV show Secret Girlfriend in 2009.

In April 2010, she guest-starred in the NCIS episode "Guilty Pleasure" as DC escort Charlotte Cook. From September 2010 to May 2011, she starred in The Event as Vicky Roberts, an assassin for a covert group.

In October 2011, she starred in the music video for The Walk by Mayer Hawthorne. In November 2011, she was cast in CSI: Miami in the recurring role of Samantha Owens, a lab technician. In 2012, she had a recurring role in the A&E series The Glades as Jennifer Starke.

Since 2016, Cole has starred in several Hallmark Channel made-for-TV movies including Appetite for Love, My Summer Prince, Christmas In Homestead, The Art of Us, Christmas Festival of Ice, One Winter Weekend, Falling For You, One Winter Proposal, Matching Hearts, and a recurring role as Ruby Herring in the Ruby Herring Mysteries.

Personal life
On June 20, 2020, Cole and producer Cameron Larson were married in a livestream ceremony from Lake Tahoe.

Filmography

Film

Television

References

External links

1984 births
Lamar High School (Arlington, Texas) alumni
21st-century American actresses
Actresses from Texas
Female models from Texas
American film actresses
American television actresses
Living people
People from Arlington, Texas